The Deirochelyinae are a subfamily of the Emydidae consisting of species native to North  and South America, some of which are frequently kept as pets. As a result of pet trade, one species, the red-eared slider, can now be found in many parts of the world.

Classification

Species

References

External links
 Family Emydidae on The Reptile Database

 
Emydidae
Turtles of North America